Harrisia simpsonii, or Simpson's applecactus, is a species of cactus in the Trichocereeae tribe.

It grows in the state of Florida, in the Southeastern United States.

References

simpsonii
Cacti of the United States
Endemic flora of Florida
Flora without expected TNC conservation status